The English word god comes from the Old English , which itself is derived from the Proto-Germanic .

Etymology

It is generally agreed that it derives from a  Proto-Indo-European neuter passive perfect participle . This form within (late) Proto-Indo-European itself was possibly ambiguous, and thought to derive from a root * "to pour, libate" (the idea survives in the Dutch word, 'Giet', meaning, to pour) (Sanskrit , see ), or from a root * (*) "to call, to invoke" (Sanskrit ). Sanskrit hutá = "having been sacrificed", from the verb root hu = "sacrifice", but a slight shift in translation gives the meaning "one to whom sacrifices are made."

Depending on which possibility is preferred, the pre-Christian meaning of the Germanic term may either have been (in the "pouring" case) "libation" or "that which is libated upon, idol" — or, as  Watkins opines in the light of Greek  "poured earth" meaning "tumulus", "the Germanic form may have referred in the first instance to the spirit immanent in a burial mound" — or (in the "invoke" case)  "invocation, prayer" (compare the meanings of Sanskrit ) or "that which is invoked".

Gaut

A significant number of scholars have connected this root with the names of three related Germanic tribes: the Geats, the Goths and the Gutar. These names may be derived from an eponymous chieftain Gaut, who was subsequently deified. He also sometimes appears in early Medieval sagas as a name of Odin or one of his descendants, a former king of the Geats, an ancestor of the Gutar, of the Goths and of the royal line of Wessex (Geats) and as a previous hero of the Goths.

Wōdanaz
Some variant forms of the name Odin such as the Lombardic  may point in the direction that the Lombardic form actually comes from Proto-Germanic . Wōdanaz or Wōđinaz is the reconstructed Proto-Germanic name of a god of Germanic paganism, known as Odin in Norse mythology, Wōden in Old English, Wodan or Wotan in Old High German and Godan in the Lombardic language. Godan was shortened to God over time and was adopted/retained by the Germanic peoples of the British isles as the name of their deity, in lieu of the Latin word Deus used by the Latin speaking Christian church, after conversion to Christianity.

During the complex christianization of the Germanic tribes of Europe, there were many linguistic influences upon the Christian missionaries. One example post downfall of the western Roman Empire are the missionaries from Rome led by Augustine of Canterbury. Augustine's mission to the Saxons in southern Britain was conducted at a time when the city of Rome was a part of a Lombardic kingdom. The translated Bibles which they brought on their mission were greatly influenced by the Germanic tribes they were in contact with, chief among them being the Lombards and Franks. The translation for the word deus of the Latin Bible was influenced by the then current usage by the tribes for their highest deity, namely Wodan by Angles, Saxons, and Franks of north-central and western Europe, and Godan by the Lombards of south-central Europe around Rome. There are many instances where the name Godan and Wodan are contracted to God and Wod.  One instance is the wild hunt (a.k.a. Wodan's wild hunt) where Wod is used.Northern Mythology, Comprising the Principal Popular Traditions and Superstitions of Scandinavia, North Germany and the Netherlands: Compiled from Original and Other Sources. In Three Volumes. North German and Netherlandish Popular Traditions and Superstitions, Volume 3, 1852

The earliest uses of the word God in Germanic writing is often cited to be in the Gothic Bible or Wulfila Bible, which is the Christian Bible as translated by Ulfilas into the Gothic language spoken by the Eastern Germanic, or Gothic, tribes. The oldest parts of the Gothic Bible, contained in the Codex Argenteus, are estimated to be from the fourth century. During the fourth century, the Goths were converted to Christianity, largely through the efforts of Bishop Ulfilas, who translated the Bible into the Gothic language in Nicopolis ad Istrum in today's northern Bulgaria. The words guda and guþ were used for God in the Gothic Bible.

Influence of ChristianityGod entered English when the language still had a system of grammatical gender. The word and its cognates were initially neuter but underwent transition when their speakers converted to Christianity, "as a means of distinguishing the personal God of the Christians from the impersonal divine powers acknowledged by pagans." However, traces of the neuter endured. While these words became syntactically masculine, so that determiners and adjectives connected to them took masculine endings, they sometimes remained morphologically neuter, which could be seen in their inflections: In the phrase, guþ meins, "my God," from the Gothic Bible, for example, guþ inflects as if it were still a neuter because it lacks a final -s, but the possessive adjective meins takes the final -s that it would with other masculine nouns.God and its cognates likely had a general, predominantly plural or collective sense prior to conversion to Christianity. After conversion, the word was commonly used in the singular to refer to the Christian deity, and also took on characteristics of a name.

Translations
The word god was used to represent Greek theos and Latin deus in Bible translations, first in the Gothic translation of the New Testament by Ulfilas.

Greek "θεός " means god in English. It is often connected with Greek "θέω" (theō), "run",Henry George Liddell, Robert Scott, A Greek-English Lexicon, on Perseus and "θεωρέω" (theoreō), "to look at, to see, to observe",Dermot Moran, The Philosophy of John Scottus Eriugena: A Study of Idealism in the Middle Ages, Cambridge University Press Latin  "holidays",  "temple", and also Armenian  "gods". Alternative suggestions (e.g. by De Saussure) connect  "smoke, spirit", attested in Baltic and Germanic words for "spook" and ultimately cognate with Latin  "smoke." The earliest attested form of the word is the Mycenaean Greek te-o (plural te-o-i), written in Linear B syllabic script.

 Capitalization 

The development of English orthography was dominated by Christian texts. Capitalized, "God" was first used to refer to the Abrahamic God and may now signify any monotheistic conception of God, including the translations of the Arabic , Persian Khuda, Indic Ishvara and the Maasai ''.

In the English language, capitalization is used for names by which a god is known, including 'God'. Consequently, its capitalized form is not used for multiple gods or when referring to the generic idea of a deity. 

Pronouns referring to a god are also often capitalized by adherents to a religion as an indication of reverence, and are traditionally in the masculine gender ("He", "Him", "His" etc) unless specifically referring to a goddess.

See also
 Anglo-Saxon paganism
 Allah (Arabic word)
 Bhagavan (Hindi word)
 El (deity) (Semitic word)
 Elohim
 Goddess
 Jumala (Finnish word)
 Khuda (Persian word)
 Names of God
 Tanri (Turkish word)
 Yahweh
 YHWH

References

External links

 Use of guþ n the Gothic Bible.
 Use of guda n the Gothic Bible.
 Gothic language and its relation to other Germanic languages such as Anglish (English) and Saxon

 
English words
Etymologies